USEA may refer to:
United States Energy Association, a non partisan energy organization
United States Eventing Association, a non profit Equestrian eventing association
United States Esports Association, a non profit esports association